Ali Asad is a Pakistani professional wrestler. He was stripped off his bronze medal at the 2022 Commonwealth Games after testing positive for performance enhancing drugs.

Career
Ali lost to India's Ravi Kumar Dahiya in the semi-final of 2022 Commonwealth Games.; but he managed to win a bronze medal by defeating New Zealand's Suraj Singh. However, he lost his medal after his dope test result came out to be positive. The test was conducted by the authorities before he left Pakistan to participate in the CWG.

References 

Pakistani male sport wrestlers
Living people
2000 births
21st-century Pakistani people
Wrestlers at the 2022 Commonwealth Games
Doping in sport